The Laboratoire d'Annecy-le-Vieux de physique des particules (in English the Annecy-le-Vieux Particle Physics Laboratory), usually abbreviated as LAPP, is a French experimental physics laboratory located in Annecy-le-Vieux in the Haute-Savoie department of France. It is associated with both the French particle and nuclear physics institute IN2P3, a subdivision of the CNRS research council, and the Université de Savoie.

The research activity of LAPP is historically linked with CERN, the European particle physics laboratory located near Geneva approximately 50 km from LAPP. However the laboratory has diversified beyond accelerator-based experiments into fields such as neutrino physics, gravitational wave detection space-based experiments.

Current experimental involvements include the ATLAS and LHCb experiments at the CERN LHC accelerator, the OPERA and Virgo Interferometer experiments, the AMS detector which will be attached to the International Space Station experiment in 2011, as well as continuing involvement in the BaBar experiment.

External links
 LAPP official web site in English

Physics laboratories
Laboratories in France
French National Centre for Scientific Research
Institutes associated with CERN